Vincent Cartwright Vickers (16 January 1879 – 3 November 1939), was an economist, Deputy Lieutenant of the City of London, director of Vickers Limited and London Assurance. Between 1910 and 1919 he was a Governor of the Bank of England, and later became President of the Economic Reform Club and Institute (ECRI).

Early life 
He was the son of Albert Vickers (born on 16 September 1838 in Sheffield) and Edith. He was educated at the Eton and Magdalen College, in Oxford.

Career 
He also worked as a humorist and artist. He wrote and illustrated The Google Book while serving as a director of the Bank of England.

References 

1879 births
Alumni of Magdalen College, Oxford
Deputy Lieutenants of the City of London
Governors of the Bank of England
1939 deaths
20th-century British economists